Vacuactivus is an international company for the production and sale of cryotherapy chambers and equipment for fitness rehabilitation, founded in 2000. It is one of the three largest manufacturers of cryotherapy chambers and cryo-equipment in the world.

The headquarters is located in Los Angeles, California.

Overview 
Vacuactivus was founded in 2000. In 2013 it opened a sales office in the United States under direction of Slim Wellness Studio LLC.

Vacuactivus manufactures equipment for medical and rehabilitation centers, gyms, cryotherapy studios and health facilities. The main product is innovative equipment for cryogenic procedures and weight loss (cryotherapy chambers, vacuum infrared treadmills).

The company's products are distributed in 50 countries around the world.

Structure 
The company is headquartered in Los Angeles, California, USA.

The main factory warehouses are located in Garden (California), Newark (New Jersey), Słupsk and Przemyśl (Poland), Dnipro (Ukraine).

References 

Companies based in Los Angeles